Tocco may refer to:

Technology
Samsung Tocco, a touch screen mobile phone
Samsung Tocco Lite, a feature phone

Geography
Tocco Caudio, Italian municipality of the Province of Benevento, Campania
Tocco da Casauria, Italian municipality of the Province of Pescara, Abruzzo

People
Tocco family, Italian noble family
Carlo I Tocco (d. 1429)
Carlo II Tocco (d. 1448)
Guglielmo Tocco (d. 1335)
Leonardo I Tocco (d. 1375 or 1377)
Leonardo II Tocco (d. 1418/19)
Leonardo III Tocco (d. 1499)
Theodora Tocco (d. 1429)
Albert Tocco (1929–2005), Italian-American mobster
Jack Tocco (1927-2014), Italian-American mobster
James Tocco (b. 1943), American pianist
Jim Tocco (b. 1976), American baseball announcer
William Tocco (1897-1972), Italian-American mobster

See also